Øisang is a surname. Notable people with the surname include:

Ingebjørg Øisang (1892–1956), Norwegian politician
Ole Øisang (1893–1963), Norwegian newspaper editor and politician
Per Øisang (1920–1967), Norwegian journalist

Norwegian-language surnames